Walls of Glass, also known as Flanagan is a 1985 American romantic comedy film directed by Scott D. Goldstein and starring Philip Bosco as the protagonist James Flanagan. The film was released on October 30, 1985.

Premise
Aging New York cabbie James Flanagan (Philip Bosco) still hopes to succeed in becoming a stage actor.

Cast
 Philip Bosco - James Flanagan
 Geraldine Page - Mama
 Linda Thorson - Andrea
 Olympia Dukakis - Mary Flanagan
 Brian Bloom - Danny Flanagan
 Steven Weber - Sean
 Louis Zorich - Lerner
 James Tolkan - Turner
 William Hickey - Papa (as Bill Hickey)
 Pierre Epstein - Miery
 Jered Holmes - Dallavanti
 F.R. Davies - Dr. Coleman
 Cary Notrica - Gordon
 Theron Montgomery - Pickles
 Ronald Yamamoto - Sushi
 Don Brockett - Van Driver
 Lynne Thigpen - Woman Cop
 Edmond Collins - TV Preacher/Radio Voice
 Holly Marie Combs - Abby Hall

References

External links
 

1985 films
American romantic comedy films
1985 romantic comedy films
1980s English-language films
1980s American films
English-language romantic comedy films